Go-Big Show is a televised American competition series that premiered on TBS on January 7, 2021. In contrast to other talent shows, Go-Big Show focuses on bigger scale performances featuring monster trucks, horse riding and large stage acts. On each episode, performers compete for an opportunity to advance toward the season finale, with a grand prize of $100,000 at stake. The second season premiered on January 6, 2022.

The show currently features Rosario Dawson, "The American Nightmare" Cody Rhodes, Jennifer Nettles and T-Pain as judges. It is hosted by Bert Kreischer.

Cast 
Go-Big Show is hosted by Bert Kreischer (comedian). Judges include "The American Nightmare" Cody Rhodes (wrestler), Jennifer Nettles (singer) and Rosario Dawson (actress). Snoop Dogg (rapper) was one of the four judges during season one. However, in August 2021, it was announced that T-Pain (rapper) would replace him for season two. Previously, DJ Khaled was planned to join the show.

Format 
On each of the six qualifier episodes, three pairs of acts perform for the judges. Each act is scored on a scale of 1 to 100 (using levers/throttles connected to a 23-foot "Power Tower" equipped with 4,000 LED lights). The higher-scoring act of the pair advances to the semifinals. If both acts in a match-up receive the same score, a coin toss is used to decide the winner.

For each of the three episodes in the semifinals, two heats of three acts each perform and are scored as in the preliminaries. The high scorers from the respective heats advance to a vote by the judges to determine which act will move on to the finals. Once the semifinals are complete, the judges select one of the three acts eliminated by their votes to advance as a "wild card".

The finale consists of three rounds, with each act being scored as in previous episodes. Two acts face off in the first round, and the low scorer is eliminated. In each of the following rounds, one new act performs and must outscore the winner of the previous round in order to eliminate them and advance. The winner of the third round receives the $100,000 grand prize.

Season 1 overview (2021) 
Each act is scored on a scale of 1 to 100, calculated as an average of the scores given by the individual judges. During the Qualifier Rounds, performers go head-to-head, and the act that receives the highest combined score moves on to the next round.

Qualifier Rounds

Episode 1: "Welcome to the Go-Big Show" 
Original air date: January 7, 2021 
US Viewership: 1.03

Match-Up 1: Kurtis Downs vs. Grace Good

Match-Up 2: Andrew S. vs. Scott Anderson 

Andrew won the tie-breaking coin toss.

Match-Up 3: Orissa Kelly vs. Jamie Keeton

Episode 2: "You Can't Unsee This!" 
Original air date: January 14, 2021 
US Viewership: 0.99

Match-Up 1: The Gator Crusader vs. Tulga

Match-Up 2: Wheelz vs. Tomas Garcilazo

Match-Up 3: Gabe The One Armed Archer vs. Cassidy Rose

Episode 3: "And You Thought That Was Risky?" 
Original air date: January 21, 2021 
US Viewership: 0.77

Match-Up 1: Ben Blaque vs. Tyler Scheuer

Match-Up 2: Ginger Duke vs. Christopher Joyce

Match-Up 3: Jackie Bibby vs. David Kalb

Episode 4: "Danger, Danger Everywhere" 

Original air date: January 28, 2021
US Viewership: 0.94

Match-Up 1: Rider Kiesner & Bethany Iles vs. Wesley Williams

Match-Up 2: Reckless Ben Schneider vs. Bill Dixon

Match-Up 3: Amina The Great vs. Leonid The Magnificent

Episode 5: "Go Out With a Bang!" 
Original air date: February 4, 2021
US Viewership: 0.87

Match-Up 1: Justin the Bull Fighter vs. Sideshow Star Krystal

Match-Up 2: James the Archer vs. Justin the Yo-Yoer

Match-Up 3: Chris the Shooter vs. Twin Motorcycle Stunts

Episode 6: "The Last Chance" 
Original air date: February 11, 2021
US Viewership: 0.75

Match-Up 1: Zach The Sling Shooter vs. The Monster Trucker

Match-Up 2: The Balance Guru vs. Scooter Trick Deijon

Match-Up 3: Callie The Baller vs. Wayne the Mentalist

Semi-Finals

Episode 7:"Semifinals" 
Original air date: February 18, 2021
US Viewership: 0.78

Match-Up 1: Tulga vs. Krystal vs. Deijon

Match-Up 2: Reckless Ben vs. Ben Blaque vs. Chris Cheng 

Tulga advanced to the finals in a 3–1 vote over Ben Schneider.

Episode 8:"Go Big, Fly High" 
Original air date: February 25, 2021
US Viewership: 0.80

Match-Up 1: Jackie vs. Tomas vs. Gabe

Match-Up 2: Kurtis vs. Leonid vs. Callie 

Tomas Garcilazo advanced to the finals in a 3–1 vote over Kurtis Downs.

Episode 9:"This Show is on Fire!" 
Original air date: March 4, 2021
US Viewership: 0.67

Match-Up 1: Kevin vs. Andrew vs. Orissa

Match-Up 2: James vs. Rider & Bethany vs. Christopher 

Andrew Stanton advanced to the finals in a 3–1 vote over James Jean.

Kurtis Downs received a "Wildcard" spot in the finals over James Jean and Ben Schneider.

Finale

Episode 10: "A Very Go Big Final" 
Original air date: March 11, 2021
US Viewership: 0.69

Finale Knock Out 

Tomas Garcilazo won the competition and the grand prize of $100,000.

Season 2 overview (2022) 
Similar to season one, the four judges' scores for an act are averaged to determine the overall score Unlike the prior season, each judge's individual scores were also revealed. During the Qualifier Rounds, performers go head-to-head, and the act that receives the higher average score moves on to the next round.

 Note: For some of the match-ups, some or all of the judges' individual scores were not shown on screen. This is indicated in the score box as "unknown".

Qualifier Rounds

Episode 1: "We're Back, Bigger Than Ever!" 
Original air date: January 6, 2022

Match-Up 1: JD "Iceman" Anderson vs. Amadeus "Ironjaw" Lopez

Match-Up 2: Professor Splash vs. David Matz

Match-Up 3: James Carter vs. Molly Schuler

Episode 2: "Now That's What I Call Big!" 
Original air date: January 13, 2022

Match-Up 1: Dare Daughter vs. Bazoo The Kloun

Match-Up 2: Gladius vs. Thomas Vu

Match-Up 3: Andrew Lee vs. Joe "Axe Man" White

Episode 3: "Bulls, Balls and Falls" 
Original air date: January 20, 2022

Match-Up 1: Jon "Divine Strength" Bruney vs. Manu "Flying Frenchman" Lataste

Match-Up 2: Horse vs. Charles Peachock

Match-Up 3: Dariella & Elena vs. Jose Angeles

Episode 4: "No Pain, No Gain" 
Original air date: January 27, 2022

Match-Up 1: Zavell 'Zero Gravity' Perry vs. Anastasia Synn

Match-Up 2: Jonathan "Rolla Bolla" Rinny vs. Leroy Patterson

Match-Up 3: Christopher & Stephanie vs. Kamikaze Kid

Episode 5: "This Is Definitely Not Child's Play" 
Original air date: February 3, 2022

Match-Up 1: The Amazing Sladek vs. Beaver Fleming

Match-Up 2: Rob Lake vs. Andrew Parker

Match-Up 3: Tori Boggs vs. Anthony Nevarez

Episode 6: "One Last Shot" 
Original air date: February 10, 2022

Match-Up 1: Lina Liu vs. Mike 'Mind Boss' Gillette

Match-Up 2: Dane Beardsley vs. Kevin 'Iron Hands' Taylor

Match-Up 3: Fernando Velasco vs. Jefrick 'Knife Ninja' Barrios

Semi-Finals

Episode 7:"Time To Raise The Game" 
Original air date: February 17, 2022

Match-Up 1: Manu Lataste vs. Kamikaze Kid vs. Andrew Parker

Match-Up 2: Daredaughter vs. Jose Angeles vs. Kevin Taylor 

Manu advanced to the finals in a 3–1 vote over Annaliese Nock.

Episode 8:"It's A Wild, Wild Semifinal" 
Original air date: February 24, 2022

Match-Up 1: James Carter vs. Tori Boggs vs. The Amazing Sladek

Match-Up 2: Horse vs. Lina Liu vs. Fernando Velasco 

James Carter advanced to the finals in a 3–1 vote over Lina Liu.

Episode 9:"It's Never Been Closer" 
Original air date: March 3, 2022

Match-Up 1: Thomas Vu vs. JD Anderson vs. Jonathan Rinny 

Thomas was eliminated due to having a combing score of 383, while JD and Jonathan once again tied with a combined score of 385. JD advanced due to having a higher score in the Qualifier round.

Match-Up 1: Professor Splash vs. Andrew Lee vs. Anastasia Synn 

Professor Splash advanced to the finals in a 3-0 vote over JD Anderson. Cody didn't vote given Professor Splash already had the majority vote.

Annaliese Nock received a "Wildcard" spot in the finals over Lina Liu and JD Anderson.

Episode 10: "Only One Can Win - The Finale" 
Original air date: March 10, 2022

Finale Knock Out 

Manu Lataste won the competition and the grand prize of $100,000.

Season 1 acts (2021) 
Season 1 featured 36 different acts.

 |  |  Wild Card

List of notable appearances of acts 
Many acts from the show have appeared in prior sports events and/or talent competitions.

Sports events and competitions 
 Aaron Fotheringham also known as Wheelz, has been a part of Nitro Circus since 2010; touring and completing various records, including four wins at the WCMX World Championships.
 Chris Cheng won the fourth season of Top Shot.
 Kurtis Downs has competed at 2017 and 2019 X Games placing 3rd and 6th in BMX Big Air respectfully. He is also a member of Nitro Circus.

Talent competition 
 Andrew Stanton appeared on season 5 of America’s Got Talent as a apart of Swing Shift Side Show being eliminated during the Wild Card show.
 Ben Blaque has appeared on four different Got Talent franchises; including season 7 of America’s Got Talent as a quarter-finalist, series 10 of Britain's Got Talent as a semifinalist, season 2 of America’s Got Talent: The Champions and La France a un incroyable talent: Battle of the Judges.
 Leonid Filatov, better known as Leonid the Magnificent, has appeared on America's Got Talent on three occasions, season 1 being eliminated in the semifinals and in season 2 and season 6 being eliminated in the Vegas Round. He also competed in season 10 of La France a un incroyable talent and season 6 of Česko Slovensko má talent.
 Orissa Kelly appeared on series 10 of Britain's Got Talent, she also appeared and won Amazingness.
 Scott Anderson appeared on season 5 of America's Got Talent (being eliminated in the Vegas Round) and Wizard Wars.
Tulga has appeared on various Got Talent shows including season 12 of America’s Got Talent, season 13 of France’s Got Incredible Talent, season 9 of Australia's Got Talent, season 12 of Das Supertalent and series 8 of Česko Slovensko má talent. He has also appeared on other talent competition shows, including the firth edition of Tú sí que vales and season six of iUmor.
Wayne Hoffman appeared on the third season of Penn & Teller: Fool Us where he successfully fooled Penn & Teller. He has also appeared on season 10 of America’s Got Talent and Phenomenon.

Season 2 acts (2022) 
Season 2 featured 36 different acts.

 |  |  Wild Card

List of notable appearances of acts 
Many acts from the show have appeared in prior sports events and/or talent competitions.

Talent competition 
JD Anderson appeared on season 9 of America's Got Talent where he was eliminated in the quarterfinals.
Professor Splash appeared on season 6 of America's Got Talent where he was eliminated in the semifinals.
Annaliese Nock appeared on season 13 of America's Got Talent where she withdrew prior to the Judge Cuts and season 15 with her father Bello who were eliminated in the quarterfinals.
Andrew Lee appeared on season 2 of Asia's Got Talent where he was eliminated in the semifinals and series 12 of Britain's Got Talent where he was eliminated in the deliberations.
Horse appeared on season 7 of America's Got Talent where he was eliminated in the quarterfinals but returned for the wildcard round where he was eliminated again.
Charles Peachock appeared on season 6 of America's Got Talent where he was eliminated in the quarterfinals but returned for the wildcard round where he was eliminated again.
Jonathan Rinny appeared on season 12 of America's Got Talent where he was eliminated in the Judge Cuts.
Kevin Taylor appeared on season 3 of America's Got Talent where he was eliminated in the Vegas Round.
Rob Lake appeared on season 13 of America's Got Talent where he was eliminated in the quarterfinals.
Leroy Patterson appeared on season 10 of America's Got Talent where he was eliminated in the Judge Cuts. He also competed on the 2nd season of the Fox Reality Channel game show Solitary, where he was the 3rd player eliminated.

Production 
The show is filmed at the Macon Coliseum in Macon, Georgia, via Propagate and Boat Rocker Media's Matador Content. Production for the 10-episode hour-long second season began in August 2021.

Ratings and reviews 
The debut episode drew a million viewers and was the best unscripted series launch by TBS in three years. Viewership declined slightly each week during the first season. However, due to its success, the series was renewed for a second season.

Common Sense Media reported it is a "mixed-bag of talent" featuring profanity and mild violence meant for mature audiences, along with family-friendly performances. The positive impact on younger viewers is the discussion of safety and the unique talents of the performers.

References

External links 
 
 

2020s American variety television series
2021 American television series debuts
English-language television shows
Talent shows
Television series by Matador Content
Television shows filmed in Georgia (U.S. state)
TBS (American TV channel) original programming